The fistball competition at the 2022 World Games took place in July 2022, in Birmingham in United States, at the Birmingham Southern College.
Originally scheduled to take place in July 2021, the Games were rescheduled for July 2022 as a result of the 2020 Summer Olympics postponement due to the COVID-19 pandemic.
 This was the first time when women's tournament in fistball took place as part of the World Games.

Qualification

Men's tournament

Women's tournament

Participating nations

Medal table

Medalists

References

External links
 The World Games 2022
 International Fistball Association
 Results book

 
2022 World Games
2022